Having a Party with Jonathan Richman is an album by the American musician Jonathan Richman, released in 1991. Richman supported the album with a North American tour.

Production
The album contains live and studio tracks, performed by Richman with just his guitar and voice, with occasional percussion. It was produced by Brennan Totten. The songs are mostly about relationships, with Richman writing in the liner notes that his musical style and methods remain unchanged. The cover photo was taken near Richman's home, around Sacramento, California.

Critical reception

Trouser Press wrote: "In a pensive frame of mind for much of the record, Richman reconsiders past times with new-found gravity." Entertainment Weekly called the album "one of his most clear-eyed and least coy records ... It’s chock-full of simplistic—but not simpleminded—songs about puzzling relationships." The Columbus Dispatch praised "My Career as a Homewrecker" and "The Girl Stands Up to Me Now". The Deseret News deemed Richman "the new wave Mister Rogers of folk."

Robert Christgau described the album as the "confessions of a reluctant grownup." The Christian Science Monitor determined that "as soon as the disc starts spinning and the strings start twanging, Richman delivers enough energy and wit to stop a roomful of conversation." The Republican noted that "he's one very funny guy, with an impressive ability to make the most out of the obvious."

AllMusic wrote that "without a band to support him, Richman grows more pensive than usual."

Track listing

References

Jonathan Richman albums
1991 albums
Rounder Records albums